Toatoa is a Māori word.

It common name for several species of plant and may refer to:

Haloragis erecta
Phyllocladus alpinus
Phyllocladus toatoa
Phyllocladus trichomanoides, also known as tanekaha

It may also refer to:

 Toatoa, New Zealand, a settlement in Bay of Plenty, New Zealand